Xanthopastis timais is a moth of the family Noctuidae. It is found throughout the lowland areas of South and Central America and in the Caribbean. In the south, it ranges to northern Argentina. It was previously also recorded from North America, but these records refer to Xanthopastis regnatrix.

References

Moths described in 1780
Glottulinae